Tony Tse Wai-chuen, BBS (born 27 October 1954) is a Hong Kong surveyor and politician. He is a member of the Legislative Council for Architectural, Surveying, Planning and Landscape (formerly Architectural, Surveying and Planning) from 2012 to 2016 and again from 2018.

Education and career
He was born on 27 October 1954 and graduated from the Hong Kong Polytechnic before joining the Hong Kong Civil Service and working in the Crown Lands & Survey Office. After 12 years, Tse moved into the commercial sector, including with Hongkong Land, Chesterton Petty, Emperor International Holdings, and Henderson Land. He also founded a property development and asset management consultancy, Brand Star.

Tse has held various public positions, including on the Urban Renewal Authority, Town Planning Board, Land and Building Advisory Committee, Municipal Services Appeals Board, Disciplinary Board Panel (Land Survey Ordinance) and Disciplinary Panel of the Hong Kong Institute of Certified Public Accountants. He was also the chairman of the Real Estate Services Training Board of the Vocational Training Council and chairman of the Surveyors Registration Board 2002-03. He was the president of the Hong Kong Institute of Surveyors, 2003-04. From 2012 to 2014 he was the president of the Hong Kong Professional and Senior Executives Association.

Legislative Council
He was first elected to the Legislative Council in Architectural, Surveying and Planning functional constituency in 2012 by defeating incumbent Patrick Lau with a thin margin of 61 votes. Despite running under as an independent politician, Tse was a known to be a supporter of Leung Chun-ying, his fellow surveyor and Hong Kong Polytechnic alumni of whom he nominated in the 2012 Chief Executive election as a member of the Election Committee. He was awarded Bronze Bauhinia Star (BBS) by Chief Executive Leung Chun-ying in 2014.

In the 2016 Legislative Council election, he lost his seat to the pro-democrat candidate Yiu Chung-yim in a three-way contest. After Yiu was disqualified for his conduct during the oath-taking process, Tse ran in the 2018 by-election and successfully retook the seat by defeating independent democrat Paul Zimmerman with nearly 3,000 votes.

He was also appointed member of the Chinese People's Political Consultative Conference (CPPCC) in January 2018. In February 2022, Tse told SCMP that he would not be attending the 2022 Two Sessions, as a Hong Kong delegate, due to family reasons.

References

External links

1954 births
Living people
HK LegCo Members 2012–2016
HK LegCo Members 2016–2021
HK LegCo Members 2022–2025
Hong Kong surveyors
Members of the Election Committee of Hong Kong, 2007–2012
Members of the Election Committee of Hong Kong, 2012–2017
Members of the Election Committee of Hong Kong, 2017–2021
Members of the National Committee of the Chinese People's Political Consultative Conference
Hong Kong pro-Beijing politicians
British expatriates in Hong Kong
Recipients of the Bronze Bauhinia Star